In Judaism, Lifnei Iver (Hebrew: לִפְנֵי עִוֵּר, "Before the Blind") is a Hebrew expression defining a prohibition against misleading people by use of a "stumbling block," or allowing a person to proceed unawares in unsuspecting danger or culpability. The origin comes from the commandment, "וְלִפְנֵ֣י  עִוֵּ֔ר  לֹ֥א  תִתֵּ֖ן  מִכְשֹׁ֑ל (Before the blind, do not put a stumbling block)".

The Hebrew term lifnei iver is one of the offenses which the Talmud argues to be punishable by excommunication in Judaism. The stumbling block as a distinct, and negative, concept is also established in Christian theology: in Catholicism it is known as creating scandal.

Biblical context
The regulation appears among a brief miscellany of regulations concerning ethical behaviour, covering issues such as consideration of the deaf, an "evil tongue", not bearing grudges, the impartiality of justice, and leaving gleanings for the poor demonstrate similar concerns against exploiting individuals, but focus on different issues.

In Jewish oral law

Many halakhic principles are derived from lifnei iver, the oral Torah expanding its ramifications beyond a purely literal interpretation. In classical rabbinical literature, lifnei iver is seen as a figuratively expressed prohibition against misleading people; the Sifra (a midrash from the time of the Mishnah) argues that since the recipient of advice would be metaphorically blind in regard to its accuracy, they would metaphorically stumble if the advice was damaging or otherwise bad.

The Talmud extends the principle to also prohibit the facilitation of a sinful act by another individual, where the person in question would otherwise have lacked the opportunity or means to have committed the sin; for example, the Talmud takes the regulation to prohibit the giving of a cup of wine to someone who has taken the nazirite vow (which includes a vow to not partake in wine or grape products). The Talmud expresses caution in regard to figurative interpretations of this principle, emphasising that the law only really covers those situations where the other individual could not possibly have committed the transgression without the aid of the first person violating the lifnei iver rule; this is known in the Talmud as two sides to the river (Trei Ivrah deNaharah)—if, for example, the person who took a nazirite vow had been about to take a glass of wine anyway, then handing them a glass of wine would not transgress lifnei iver.

Lifnei iver as a principle recurs many times in more practical applications of Jewish law. For example, the Shulchan Aruch, an authoritative codification of Jewish Law (Halacha), warns a father to not physically chastise older children, as this will only entice them to hit back, which in its view would be a capital offence (Shulchan Aruch Yoreh Deah 240:20).

Academic perspectives
According to the editors of the 1906 Jewish Encyclopedia, the prevailing notion in ancient Middle Eastern cultures was that bodily ailments and defects, such as blindness and loss of hearing, as well as circumstantial ailments, such as poverty, were punishments for sin; the blind, together with cripples and lepers, were outcast by society and were prevented from entering towns, becoming paupers as a result. The biblical provision of laws to protect individuals afflicted in this manner would have had the effect, perhaps intended, of reducing the prejudice they suffered.

See also
 Stolpersteine, German expression for "stumbling blocks" and memorial artwork by Gunter Demnig commemorating those deported and killed by the Nazis
 Stumbling block

References

 

Jewish courts and civil law
Jewish ethical law
Negative Mitzvoth
Hebrew words and phrases in Jewish law